The related to receptor tyrosine kinase (RYK) gene encodes the protein Ryk.

The protein encoded by this gene is an atypical member of the family of growth factor receptor protein tyrosine kinases, differing from other members at a number of conserved residues in the activation and nucleotide binding domains. This gene product belongs to a subfamily whose members do not appear to be regulated by phosphorylation in the activation segment. It has been suggested that mediation of biological activity by recruitment of a signaling-competent auxiliary protein may occur through an as yet uncharacterized mechanism. Two alternative splice variants have been identified, encoding distinct isoforms.

History
The gene encoding mouse RYK was first identified in 1992.
Subsequently, cDNA encoding the RYK protein have been isolated from the following species.
rat
chicken
Human
Zebrafish
Caenorhabditis elegans
Drosophila

Structure
In common with other receptor tyrosine kinase family members, RYK is composed of three domains, an N-terminal, extracellular ligand-binding domain, a transmembrane spanning domain and a C-terminal intracellular domain. However, in contrast to other receptor tyrosine kinases the C-terminal domain of RYK is devoid of detectable kinase activity.

Function
RYK is involved in regulation of axon growth during development of the nervous system.

References

Further reading

Genes on human chromosome 3
Tyrosine kinase receptors